Arnold Creek is a neighborhood (and a creek) in the Southwest section of Portland, Oregon, just north of the city of Lake Oswego and Clackamas County.  It borders West Portland Park to the west, Markham and Marshall Park to the north, Collins View and Tryon Creek State Natural Area to the east, and Lake Oswego and the unincorporated Multnomah County enclave of Englewood to the south.

Part of Maricara Natural Area (1988) is located in Arnold Creek (as well as in Markham).

References

External links
Friends of Arnold Creek

Neighborhoods in Portland, Oregon